Sam Hardy (26 August 1882 – 24 October 1966) was an English footballer who played as a goalkeeper.

Football career
In 1902, Chesterfield manager Jack Hoskin beat Derby County to sign Hardy, doing so under a lamp post in Newbold. Hardy, something of a shrewd character, wouldn't sign the forms until Hoskin promised to pay him 18 shillings when the original offer was five shillings. Hardy soon gained himself a reputation for being unfazeable and it wasn't long before he started attracting the attention of the top clubs in the country.

Liverpool manager Tom Watson had witnessed him play against his side in a 2nd Division fixture at Anfield and although Liverpool won the match 6–1, Watson remembered that if it hadn't been for the performance of Hardy that day, Liverpool could well have gone on to record their biggest-ever win. After 77 appearances, in which Hardy kept 30 clean-sheets, Watson approached both Chesterfield and Hardy and signed him for £500 in May 1905. After Ned Doig had begun the season as number 1, Hardy came in to make his debut in the ninth game of the campaign on 21 October 1905 at Anfield in a league match against Nottingham Forest. Liverpool won the game 4–1 and Hardy established himself as the Reds number 1.

By the end of his first season he had bagged a Football League First Division championship medal as Liverpool won their second title in five years. Hardy made 30 league (and 5 cup) appearances during the 1905–06 season as the Reds beat Preston North End by four points in the two points for a win system.

In 1907, Hardy caught the eye of the Football Association committee who gave him his England debut on 14 October at Goodison Park; Ireland were the opponents and Hardy gained his first clean-sheet as England won 1–0.

Hardy became one of the best goalkeepers of his generation over the next few seasons and by the time he was allowed to leave Anfield in 1912 he had earned himself the nickname 'Safe and Steady Sam'. He had made 239 appearances between the sticks for the Reds when he left for Aston Villa for £1500 where he won two FA Cups in 1913 and 1920.

Like so many other professionals, his career was interrupted by the outbreak of the First World War. Hardy kept his eye in during the conflict playing for his own club, Villa, four times, Plymouth Argyle, Nottingham Forest and the Royal Naval barracks Plymouth.

Hardy became a member of the P.F.A in 1921 and also left Villa after making 183 appearances. He joined Nottingham Forest for £1000 and helped them to the Second Division title by the end of his first season at the club in 1922. He played 102 times for Forest before injury ended his career when just shy of his 40th birthday.

By the end of his international days, Hardy had played for 14 years as England's premier goalkeeper, earning himself 21 caps.

Upon retirement, Hardy became a publican, keeping pubs and billiard halls in the Chesterfield area and remained so until his death aged 84 on 24 October 1966.

Many goalkeeping experts – as well as England and West Bromwich Albion full-back Jesse Pennington – regard Sam Hardy as the greatest keeper of all, a statement that goes a long way to be backed up by Hardy appearing on the BBC's Football Legends List. He also was voted in at No. 94 in the official Liverpool Football Club web site poll.

Personal life 
Hardy was a relative of Nottingham Forest manager Stan Hardy. His son Jack, grandson Sam, nephew Edgar and cousins Ernest and Harry all became footballers. He served as an ordinary seaman in the Royal Navy during the First World War.

Honours
Newbold White Star
 Byron Cup: 1901–02

Liverpool
 Football League First Division: 1905–06

Aston Villa
 FA Cup: 1912–13, 1919–20

Nottingham Forest
 Football League Second Division: 1921–22

Individual
Berlin-Britz Goalkeeper of the Decade (1910s)

See also
List of footballers in England by number of league appearances (500+)

References

External links
 Official player profile at Liverpoolfc.tv
 Player profile at LFChistory.net

 Sam Hardy at goalkeepersaredifferent.com

1882 births
1966 deaths
Footballers from Derbyshire
English footballers
Military personnel from Derbyshire
England international footballers
England wartime international footballers
Chesterfield F.C. players
Liverpool F.C. players
Aston Villa F.C. players
Nottingham Forest F.C. players
Association football goalkeepers
English Football League players
English Football League representative players
Royal Navy personnel of World War I
Royal Navy sailors
FA Cup Final players